The Biloxi tribe are Native Americans of the Siouan language family. They call themselves by the autonym Tanêks(a) in Siouan Biloxi language. When first encountered by Europeans in 1699, the Biloxi inhabited an area near the coast of the Gulf of Mexico near what is now the city of Biloxi, Mississippi. They were eventually forced west into Louisiana and eastern Texas. The Biloxi language--Tanêksąyaa ade--has been extinct since the 1930s, when the last known native semi-speaker, Emma Jackson, died.

Today, remaining Biloxi descendants have merged with the Tunica and other remnant peoples. Together they were federally recognized in 1981; today they are called the Tunica-Biloxi Indian Tribe and share a small reservation in Avoyelles Parish, Louisiana. Descendants of several other small tribes are enrolled with them. The two main tribes were from different language groups: the Biloxi were Siouan-speaking and the Tunica had an isolate language. Today the tribe members speak English or French.

History
Little is known of Biloxi history prior to their contact with Europeans in 1699. Information about them has been derived from archeological  studies, oral histories recounting their traditions, and materials of related tribes. 

They encountered the French Canadian Pierre LeMoyne d'Iberville, who was establishing France's Louisiana colony. D'Iberville was told that the Biloxi nation was formerly quite numerous, but that their people were severely decimated by an epidemic of smallpox, which left an entire village abandoned and in ruins. D'Iberville described coming upon a deserted village in the late 17th century after the people had been stricken two years prior by disease. The village contained remnants of cabins made of mud, with roofs covered in tree bark (in Dorsey & Swanton 1912: 6). They could have contracted it from other peoples in contact with Europeans, among whom smallpox was endemic. The Native Americans had no immunity to the disease. 

Biloxis "were descendants of the mound-building Mississippian culture people...." (Brain 1990: 80). Although historically of Siouan-language origin, ancestors of the Biloxi shared similar cultural features with other peoples in the Southeast, what anthropologists call the Southeastern Ceremonial Complex (SECC). They were an agricultural society, in which women cultivated varieties of maize, beans and squash. The men supplemented the agrarian diet by hunting deer, bear, and bison (Kniffen et al. 1987). They fished year round.(Brain 1990). 

As in many largely agrarian societies, control of access to granaries and storage facilities, as well as controlled distribution of their contents, led to a stratified society revolving around the Yaaxitąąyą, or "Great Sacred One," the highest ruling noble, king or queen. The Yaaxitąąyą had a cadre of lesser nobles or deputies called ixi. The Biloxi word for king or chief, ąyaaxi or yaaxi, is also the word for medicine man or shaman.  Thus, the political rulers were also spiritual practitioners. 

While little is known of Biloxi funeral practices among commoners, the bodies of deceased ąyaaxi were dried in fire and smoke. The preserved bodies were placed in an upright position on red poles stuck into the ground around the central interior of a temple. The deceased would be set up on a platform near the front entrance of the temple. Food would be "offered" daily by visitors (De Montigny 1753: 240).

The American ethnologist James Owen Dorsey, a specialist in Siouan peoples, visited the Biloxi in Louisiana in 1892 and 1893. According to the data he compiled, which was published in the 1912 dictionary, in traditional Biloxi culture prior to the arrival of Europeans, men wore breechcloth or breechclout, usually made of deerskin which was "passed between the legs and tucked up under a belt before and behind, with considerable to spare at either end" (Swanton 1985: 681). Belts were made of skin or of beaded cord. "Men covered the upper parts of their bodies with a garment or garments made of the skins of various animals, such as the bear, deer (particularly the male deer), panther, wildcat, beaver, otter, raccoon, squirrel, and bison. Some of these were made long, were used particularly by old people, and were intended for winter wear" (ibid.). As in other tribes, the women processed and sewed animal skins to create such clothing, as well as moccasins and leggings. Leggings were worn during cold weather or to protect the legs from underbrush. The lower portions of leggings were tucked under the rims of moccasins and the upper ends were usually fastened to the belt by means of straps (ibid.: 682). The Biloxi made tools and utensils from bison and deer horn, and wore ornaments of cut and polished seashells. Some Biloxi had traditional facial tattoos and wore nose- and/or earrings (Dorsey & Swanton 1912).    

The surviving Biloxi gradually migrated from Mississippi to Louisiana and Texas. They merged with other peoples such as Caddo, Choctaw, and most recently, Tunica people.
Although much of tribal structure had disappeared by the time ethnologist James Owen Dorsey visited them in Louisiana in 1892 and 1893, they still traced descent in the maternal line, in a matrilineal kinship system. Three clans were active: Ita aⁿyadi, Deer people; Oⁿʇi aⁿyadi, Bear people; and Naqotodc̷a aⁿyadi, Alligator people. Most Biloxi identified as Deer people. Dorsey described their elaborate social system, with more than 53 terms for kinship relations and a dozen which had been forgotten, more than any other Siouan people he had visited and studied.

See also
Biloxi language
Tunica-Biloxi
Mosopelea

References

Brain, Jeffrey (1990), The Tunica-Biloxi. Indians of North America series. New York: Chelsea House Publishers.
Dorsey, James Owen. and James Swanton (1912), A Dictionary of the Biloxi and Ofo Languages. Bureau of American Ethnology, 47. Washington, D.C.
De Montigny, Dumont (1753), Mémoires historiques sur la Louisiane. Paris.
Kniffen, Fred & H. Gregory & G. Stokes (1987).  The Historic Indian Tribes of Louisiana: from 1542 to the Present. Baton Rouge: Louisiana State University Press.

Siouan peoples
Native American tribes in Louisiana
Native American tribes in Mississippi
Native American tribes in Texas

ca:Biloxi
ru:Туника-билокси